Bouteloua eriopoda, commonly known as black grama, is a perennial prairie grass that is native to the Southwestern United States. Its main means of reproduction is by stolons, as its ratio of viable seeds to sterile ones is naturally low. The disparity may play a role in its lack of tolerance to overgrazing (relative to other grasses), but aside from this B. eriopoda is a good forage food for livestock.

It was first described, as Chondrosum eriopodum, in 1848 from specimens collected along and nearby the "Del Norte" river in New Mexico.

Distribution
B. eriopoda is found in the following U.S. states: Arizona, California, Colorado, Kansas, New Mexico, Nevada, Oklahoma, Texas, Utah and Wyoming.

References

External links

USDA PLANTS Profile for Bouteloua eriopoda (black grama)
Jepson Manual treatment for Bouteloua eriopoda

eriopoda
Grasses of North America
Grasses of Mexico
Grasses of the United States
Native grasses of California
Native grasses of Texas
Native grasses of Oklahoma
Flora of Northeastern Mexico
Flora of Arizona
Flora of Colorado
Flora of Kansas
Flora of New Mexico
Flora of Nevada
Flora of Oklahoma
Flora of Texas
Flora of Utah
Flora of Wyoming
Flora of the California desert regions
Flora of the Chihuahuan Desert
Flora of the Mexican Plateau
Natural history of the Mojave Desert
Plants described in 1848
North American desert flora
Flora without expected TNC conservation status